Michael M. Bugarewicz (pronounced "bug-uh-rab-ich") is an American NASCAR crew chief. He currently serves as director of performance for SHR.  Previously he was the crew chief for the No. 10 Ford Mustang driven by Aric Almirola for Stewart-Haas Racing in the NASCAR Cup Series. He was previously the crew chief for SHR's No. 14 team, where he worked with Tony Stewart in 2016 and Clint Bowyer from 2017-2019 before being reassigned to Almirola's team. Prior to being a crew chief, he was the engineer for Kevin Harvick's No. 4 team at SHR, where he won the 2014 championship with him as well as a second-place points finish in 2015, which included a remarkable thirteen second-place race finishes and 28 top-10 race finishes for Harvick and the team that year.

References

External links
 

1982 births
Living people
People from Lehighton, Pennsylvania
NASCAR crew chiefs